Patrick Drewes (born 4 February 1993) is a German professional footballer who plays as a goalkeeper for  club SV Sandhausen.

Career statistics

References

External links
 
 

1993 births
Living people
People from Delmenhorst
German footballers
Footballers from Lower Saxony
Association football goalkeepers
2. Bundesliga players
3. Liga players
Regionalliga players
Swiss Challenge League players
VfL Wolfsburg II players
VfL Wolfsburg players
FC Wil players
SC Preußen Münster players
Würzburger Kickers players
VfL Bochum players
SV Sandhausen players
German expatriate footballers
German expatriate sportspeople in Switzerland
Expatriate footballers in Switzerland